Jyotiprasad as a Film Maker is a book about famed director Jyoti Prasad Agarwala authored by Apurba Sarma and published by Rajib Baruah of Adi Publication on behalf of the Gauhati Cine Club. The book was released on 17 June 2005 on the occasion of Xilpi Divas, the filmmaker's birthday. The book covers the concepts and ideas of Jyotiprasad's filmmaking and depicts the national and international cinematic scene of his time.

See also
Jyoti Prasad Agarwala
Gauhati Cine Club

References

2005 non-fiction books
Indian books
Assamese literature
Books from Assam